Kolbjørn is a given name. Notable people with the given name include:

Kolbjørn Almlid (born 1945), Norwegian businessman and politician
Kolbjørn Buøen (1895–1975), Norwegian actor
Kolbjørn Fjeld (1901–1978), Norwegian librarian and publisher
Kolbjørn Hauge (1926–2007), Norwegian schoolteacher and non-fiction writer
Kolbjørn Kvam (1865–1933), Norwegian sports shooter
Kolbjørn Lyslo (born 1975), Norwegian musician
Kolbjørn Skaare (1931–2017), Norwegian numismatist
Kolbjørn Stordrange (1924–2004), Norwegian politician
Kolbjørn Varmann (1904–1980), Norwegian priest and politician